The 1978 Revelation on Priesthood was a revelation announced by leaders of the Church of Jesus Christ of Latter-day Saints (LDS Church) that reversed a long-standing policy excluding men of black African descent from the priesthood.

Beginning in the late 1840s, individuals of black African descent were prohibited from ordination to the LDS Church's priesthood—normally held by all male members who meet church standards of spiritual "worthiness"—and from receiving temple ordinances such as the endowment and celestial marriage (sealing). The origins of the policy are still unclear: during the 20th century, most church members and leaders believed the policy had originated during founding prophet Joseph Smith's time, but church research in the 1960s and 1970s found no evidence of the prohibition before the presidency of Brigham Young. LDS Church presidents Heber J. Grant and David O. McKay are known to have privately stated that the restriction was a temporary one, and would be lifted at a future date by a divine revelation to a church president.

In 2013, the LDS Church posted an essay about race and the priesthood revelation.

Background

Men of black African descent were permitted to hold the priesthood in the early years of the Latter Day Saint movement, when Joseph Smith was alive. After Smith died, Brigham Young became leader of the LDS Church and many were excluded from holding the priesthood. This practice persisted after Young's death, and was maintained until the announcement of the 1978 revelation.

Events leading up to the revelation

In the decades leading up to the 1978 revelation, it became increasingly difficult for the church to maintain its policy on Africans and the priesthood. The difficulties arose both from outside protests and internal challenges encountered as the membership grew in far away areas of the world outside of the predominantly white Utah. Internal challenges in administering the priesthood ban were mainly due to the difficulty in determining which peoples were of African ancestry in areas such as Brazil, the Philippines and Caribbean and Polynesian Islands as well as shortages of available people for local church leadership positions in areas with a predominantly black population such as Nigeria or the Dominican Republic.

The majority of the protests against the policy coincided with the rise of the civil rights movement in the United States during the 1960s. In 1963, Hugh B. Brown made a statement on civil rights during General Conference in order to avert a planned protest of the conference by the NAACP. During the late 1960s and 1970s, black athletes at some universities refused to compete against teams from church owned Brigham Young University. A protest in 1974 was in response to the exclusion of black scouts to become leaders in church sponsored Boy Scout troops. By 1978, when the policy was changed, external pressure had slackened somewhat.

In the 1960s, an effort was made to establish a church presence in Nigeria where many natives had expressed interest. Church leaders found it difficult to make progress in establishing the church in that region without a change in the priesthood policy. Issues regarding possible expansion in Nigeria were considered in correspondence between the South African Mission and church general authorities from as early as 1946. LDS Church leaders in the Caribbean, notably in the Dominican Republic (described at the time as 98% black), had expressed the difficulty of proselytizing efforts in the region due to priesthood restrictions.

In 1969, during a weekly meeting the apostles voted to overturn the priesthood ban. However, Harold B. Lee, a senior apostle at the time, was not present due to travel. When he returned he made the argument that the ban could not be overturned administratively but rather required a revelation from God. Lee called for a re-vote, which did not pass.

On March 1, 1975, LDS Church president Spencer W. Kimball announced plans to build a temple in São Paulo, Brazil. Before the 1978 revelation, not only were men of black African descent denied ordination to the priesthood, but men and women of black African descent were also excluded from performing most of the various ordinances in the temple. Determining priesthood and temple eligibility in Brazil was problematic due to the considerable intermarriage between Amerindians, Europeans, and Africans since 1500, and high uncertainty in tracing ancestral roots. Furthermore, in the Brazilian culture, racial identification had more to do with physical appearance and social class than blood lines. The cultural differences in understanding race created confusion between the native Brazilians and the American missionaries. When the temple was announced, church leaders realized the difficulty of restricting persons with various bloodlines from attending the temple in Brazil.

During the first half of the 20th century, most church members and leaders believed the priesthood ban had originated with church founder Joseph Smith. Because of this belief, church leaders were hesitant to overturn the ban. Scholars in the 1960s and 1970s found no evidence of the prohibition before Brigham Young. This evidence made it easier for Kimball to consider making a change.

Softening of the policy

Prior to the complete overturning of the priesthood ban by revelation, several administrative actions were taken to soften its effect.

Before David O. McKay visited the South Africa mission in 1954, the policy was that any man desiring to receive the priesthood in the mission was required to prove a lack of African ancestors in his genealogy. Six missionaries were tasked with assisting in the necessary genealogical research but even then it was often difficult to establish lack of African ancestry. McKay changed the policy to presume non-African ancestry except when there was evidence to the contrary. This change allowed many more people to be ordained without establishing genealogical proof.

Four years later, McKay gave permission for Fijians to receive the priesthood despite their dark skin color. Thus, the priesthood ban was restricted to those people who were specifically of African descent. In 1967, the same policy that was used in South Africa was extended to cover Brazilians as well.  In 1974, blacks were allowed to serve as proxies for baptisms for the dead.

Revelation

In the years prior to his presidency, Spencer W. Kimball kept a binder of notes and clippings related to the issue. In the first years of his presidency, he was recorded as frequently making the issue one of investigation and prayer. In June 1977, Kimball asked at least three general authorities—apostles Bruce R. McConkie, Thomas S. Monson, and Boyd K. Packer—to submit memos "on the doctrinal basis of the prohibition and how a change might affect the Church", to which McConkie wrote a long treatise concluding there were no scriptural impediments to a change. During 1977, Kimball obtained a personal key to the Salt Lake Temple for entering in the evenings after the temple closed, and often spent hours alone in its upper rooms praying for divine guidance on a possible change. On May 30, 1978, Kimball presented his two counselors with a statement he had written in longhand removing all racial restrictions on ordination to the priesthood, stating that he "had a good, warm feeling about it."

On June 1, 1978, following the monthly meeting of general authorities in the Salt Lake Temple, Kimball asked his counselors and the ten members of Quorum of the Twelve Apostles then present to remain behind for a special meeting. Kimball began by describing his studies, thoughts, and prayers on removing the restriction and on his growing assurance that the time had come for the change. Kimball asked each of the men present to share their views, and all spoke in favor of changing the policy. After all present had shared their views, Kimball led the gathered apostles in a prayer circle to seek final divine approval for the change. As Kimball prayed, many in the group recorded feeling a powerful spiritual confirmation. Bruce R. McConkie later said: "There are no words to describe the sensation, but simultaneously the Twelve and the three members of the First Presidency had the Holy Ghost descend upon them and they knew that God had manifested his will .... I had had some remarkable spiritual experiences before ... but nothing of this magnitude." L. Tom Perry described: "I felt something like the rushing of wind. There was a feeling that came over the whole group. When President Kimball got up he was visibly relieved and overjoyed."  Gordon B. Hinckley later said: "For me, it felt as if a conduit opened between the heavenly throne and the kneeling, pleading prophet of God who was joined by his Brethren."

The church formally announced the change on June 9, 1978. The story led many national news broadcasts and was on the front page of most American newspapers, and in most largely Latter-day Saint communities in Utah and Idaho telephone networks were completely jammed with excited callers. The announcement was formally approved by the church at the October 1978 general conference, and is included in LDS Church's edition of the Doctrine and Covenants as Official Declaration 2.

Revelation accepted at general conference
On September 30, 1978, during the church's 148th Semiannual General Conference, the following was presented by N. Eldon Tanner, First Counselor in the First Presidency:

In early June of this year, the First Presidency announced that a revelation had been received by President Spencer W. Kimball extending priesthood and temple blessings to all worthy male members of the Church. President Kimball has asked that I advise the conference that after he had received this revelation, which came to him after extended meditation and prayer in the sacred rooms of the holy temple, he presented it to his counselors, who accepted it and approved it. It was then presented to the Quorum of the Twelve Apostles, who unanimously approved it, and was subsequently presented to all other General Authorities, who likewise approved it unanimously.

On that day, the general conference unanimously voted to accept the revelation "as the word and will of the Lord."

Ramifications
Following the revelation, black male members were allowed to be ordained to the priesthood.  Black members and their spouses regardless of race were allowed to enter the temple and undergo the temple rituals, including celestial marriages.  Black members could be adopted into a tribe of Israel through a patriarchal blessing.  Black members were also allowed to serve missions and hold leadership positions.  Proselytization restrictions were removed, so missionaries no longer needed special permission to teach black people, converts were no longer asked about African heritage, and marks were no longer made on membership records indicating African heritage.

Statements after the revelation
Later in 1978, apostle Bruce R. McConkie said:

There are statements in our literature by the early brethren which we have interpreted to mean that the Negroes would not receive the priesthood in mortality. I have said the same things, and people write me letters and say, "You said such and such, and how is it now that we do such and such?" And all I can say to that is that it is time disbelieving people repented and got in line and believed in a living, modern prophet. Forget everything that I have said, or what President Brigham Young or President George Q. Cannon or whomsoever has said in days past that is contrary to the present revelation. We spoke with a limited understanding and without the light and knowledge that now has come into the world.... We get our truth and our light line upon line and precept upon precept. We have now had added a new flood of intelligence and light on this particular subject, and it erases all the darkness and all the views and all the thoughts of the past. They don’t matter any more....  It doesn’t make a particle of difference what anybody ever said about the Negro matter before the first day of June of this year.

On the topic of doctrine and policy for the race ban lifting the apostle Dallin H. Oaks stated in 1988, "I don’t know that it’s possible to distinguish between policy and doctrine in a church that believes in continuing revelation and sustains its leader as a prophet. ... I’m not sure I could justify the difference in doctrine and policy in the fact that before 1978 a person could not hold the priesthood and after 1978 they could hold the priesthood." In 2013, the LDS Church posted an essay on the priesthood ban, stating that the ban was based more on racism than revelation.  The essay places the origin of the ban on Brigham Young, arguing there was no evidence any black men were denied the priesthood during Joseph Smith's leadership.  The essay also disavowed theories promoted in the past including "that black skin is a sign of divine disfavor or curse, or that it reflects actions in a premortal life; that mixed-race marriages are a sin; or that blacks or people of any other race or ethnicity are inferior in any way to anyone else."

Official Declaration 2
Official Declaration 2 is the canonized formal 1978 announcement by the church's First Presidency that the priesthood would no longer be subject to restrictions based on race or skin color. The declaration was canonized by the LDS Church at its general conference on September 30, 1978, through the process of common consent. Since 1981, the text has been included in the church's Doctrine and Covenants, one of its standard works of scripture. It is the most recent text that has been added to the LDS Church's open canon of scripture. The announcement that was canonized had previously been announced by a June 8, 1978, letter from the First Presidency, which was composed of Spencer W. Kimball, N. Eldon Tanner, and Marion G. Romney.

Unlike much of the Doctrine and Covenants, Official Declaration 2 is not itself presented as a revelation from God. However, its text announces that Jesus Christ "by revelation has confirmed that the long-promised day has come when every faithful, worthy man in the Church may receive the holy priesthood." Thus, it is regarded as "the official declaration of the revelation." No text of the revelation has been released by the church, but it is common for Latter-day Saints to refer to the "revelation on the priesthood" in describing the changes wrought by the announcement and canonization of Official Declaration 2.

Modern clarification disavows reasons for the restrictions
Sometime between 2014 and 2015, the LDS Church, in publishing essays to expand understanding of church doctrines and policies, focused one on the subject of "Race and the Priesthood". As part of that essay, the church officially acknowledged that the reasons for the previous racial restrictions were unknown, and officially disavowed the racist explanations for the policy, but did not disavow the restrictions themselves. As part of the 40th anniversary celebration of the revelation Dallin H. Oaks said that, "the Lord rarely gives reasons for the commandments and directions He gives to His servants," but acknowledged the hurt that the restrictions caused before they were rescinded, and encouraged all church members to move past those feelings and focus on the future. The LDS Church has not formally apologized for its policies and former teachings.

See also

Black Mormons
Black people and priesthood (LDS)
Criticism of the Church of Jesus Christ of Latter-day Saints
Genesis Group
Proclamations of the First Presidency and the Quorum of the Twelve Apostles

Notes

References

Citations

Works cited

Further reading

External links
A Work in Progress: The Latter-day Saint Struggle with Blacks and the Priesthood – Seth Payne at mormonstudies.net
Official Declaration 2 – official text found in the Doctrine and Covenants at churchofjesuschrist.org

1978 in Christianity
Revelation On Priesthood, 1978
Doctrine and Covenants
History of the Church of Jesus Christ of Latter-day Saints
Mormonism and race
The Church of Jesus Christ of Latter-day Saints in Africa
The Church of Jesus Christ of Latter-day Saints in Brazil
20th-century Mormonism
Revelation
June 1978 events
Revelation in Mormonism